The Electronic Democracy Party (Turkish: Elektronik Demokrasi Partisi, abbreviated EDP, eP or e-Parti) is a political party in Turkey which advocates e-Democracy and liberalism. It was formed by Emrehan Halıcı, a Member of Parliament from Ankara, on 26 November 2014. Halıcı had previously resigned from the Republican People's Party (CHP). The party highlights the democratic deficit and the lack of inner-party democracy as key areas of concern.

The Electronic Democracy Party is legally inactive according to September 2016 records of the Chief Public Prosecutor's Office.

References

Liberal parties in Turkey
Political parties established in 2014
2014 establishments in Turkey
Political parties disestablished in 2016
2016 disestablishments in Turkey
Defunct political parties in Turkey